Roman Candles is a 1920 silent comedy-drama film directed by Jack Pratt and starring J. Frank Glendon and Edward M. Kimball. The film was released in 1920 as a seven reeler on State's Rights basis. In 1922 two independent distributors rereleased it with a 5 reel running length.

It is preserved in the Library of Congress and the BFI Film and TV Institute, London.

Cast
J. Frank Glendon as John Arnold, Jr.
Phalba Morgan as Senorita Zorra Gamorra
Edward M. Kimball as John Arnold, Sr.
Hector V. Sarno as The President 
Sidney D'Albrook as The Secret Service Chief
Jack Pratt as Mendoza, The Captain
Mechtilde Price 
Lola Smith 
Bill Conant 
Jack Waltemeyer  
Teddy as A Dog

References

External links
Roman Candles at IMDb.com

1920 films
American silent feature films
1920 comedy-drama films
Silent American comedy-drama films
American black-and-white films
Films directed by Jack Pratt
1920s American films